Southwestern Krai, also known as Kiev General Governorate or Kiev, Podolia, and Volhynia General Governorate was an administrative-territorial and political subdivision (a krai) of the Russian Empire in 1832–1914. It has a special status established for the gradual political and economical integration and assimilation of the non-Russian (Jewish, Polish, Tatar Ukrainian) population of right-bank Ukraine within the Russian Empire.

History
The Southwestern Krai or the Governor General of Kiev, Podolia and Volhynia consisting of three gubernias, the Volhynia, the Podolia and the Kiev Governorate, was supposedly incepted on January 22, 1832 when Vasily Levashov, was appointed the Military Governor of Kiev and the General Governor of Podolia and Volhynia. However a position of Kiev Military Governor existed since 1796.

Separately there existed the Governor General of Little Russia and the Governor General of New Russia and Bessarabia.

From 1881 the territory of the Governorate General was de facto expanded to five Gubernias as Governor General Alexander Drenteln was also appointed the temporary Governor General of Chernigov and Poltava governorates (former governorates of the Governor General of Little Russia).

In 1889 the Governorate General original jurisdiction of only three gubernias was restored. It existed in this form until 1915 when the territorial unit was abolished. Fyodor Trepov was the last General Governor of Kiev.

In 1912 the Kholm Governorate, a former governorate of the Congress Poland, was detached from it, and attached to the Kiev General Governorate.

List of General Governors and Military Governors
 November 18, 1796 - November 29, 1797 Count Ivan Saltykov
 November 30, 1797 - March 12, 1798 Didrich Arend Rosenberg
 March 1798 - June 1798 Ivan Gudovich
 June 13, 1798 - 1799 Aleksandr Bekleshov
 1801 - 1803 Andrei Fensh
 1803 - 1806 Alexander Tormasov
 September 28, 1806 - July 3, 1809 Mikhail Kutuzov
 1810 - August 1818 Mikhail Miloradovich
 1827 - 1829 Peter Zheltukhin
 1829 - January 22, 1832 Boris Knyazhnin
 January 22, 1832 - June 9, 1835 Count Vasiliy Levashov
 June 9, 1835 - November 15, 1837 Count Aleksandr Guryev
 December 29, 1837 - August 30, 1852 Dmitriy Bibikov
 August 30, 1852 - November 12, 1862 Prince Illarion Vasilchikov
 January 19, 1863 - January 19, 1865 Nicholas Annenkov
 January 19, 1865 - January 16, 1869 Aleksandr Bezak
 January 16, 1869 - April 16, 1878 Prince Aleksandr Dondukov-Korsakov
 April 16, 1878 - January 13, 1881 Mikhail Chertkov
 January 13, 1881 - July 15, 1888 Alexander Drenteln
 August 12, 1889 - December 7, 1897 Count Aleksei Ignatiev
 January 1, 1898 - December 24, 1903 Mikhail Dragomirov
 December 24, 1903 - October 19, 1905 Nicholas Kleigels
 October 19, 1905 - December 18, 1908 Vladimir Sukhomlinov
 December 18, 1908 - 1914 Fyodor Trepov

See also
Northwestern Krai
Western Krai
November Uprising
Law about Zemstvos in the western governorates
Palace of Governor-General in Kyiv

Further reading
 [Киевское, Подольское и волынское генерал-губернаторство (Юго-Западный край) 22.01.1832-1915]

References

External links
 Shandra, V. Kiev General-Governorate (КИЇВСЬКЕ ГЕНЕРАЛ-ГУБЕРНАТОРСТВО). Encyclopedia of History of Ukraine. 2007.

Krais of the Russian Empire
States and territories established in 1832
States and territories disestablished in 1915
1830s establishments in the Russian Empire
Governorates-General of the Russian Empire